Moeydeleh-ye Sofla (also Romanized as Mo‘eydeleh-ye Soflá and Mo‘edeleh-ye Soflá) is a village in Moshrageh Rural District, Moshrageh District, Ramshir County, Khuzestan Province, Iran. At the 2006 census, its population was 273, in 47 families.

References 

Populated places in Ramshir County